"For the First Time" is a song co-written and recorded by American country music artist Darius Rucker. It was released to radio on July 24, 2017 as the second single from his fifth country studio album, When Was the Last Time. Rucker wrote the song with Derek George and Scooter Carusoe.

Commercial performance
The song has sold 90,000 copies in the United States as of June 2018. It was certified Platinum by Recording Industry Association of America (RIAA) in 2021 for equivalent sales of 1,000,000 units.

Music video
The music video was directed by Jim Wright and premiered in October 2017.

Chart performance

Weekly charts

Year-end charts

Certifications

References

2017 songs
2017 singles
Darius Rucker songs
Songs written by Derek George
Songs written by Scooter Carusoe
Capitol Records Nashville singles
Song recordings produced by Ross Copperman